Ferari Basanta is a 1983 Bangladeshi film starring Bulbul Ahmed, Bobita and Suchorita. It bagged Bachsas Awards in six categories that year.

Cast 
 Bobita
 Bulbul Ahmed
 Suchorita

Soundtrack
All songs were composed by Sheikh Sadi Khan and lyrics were written by Mohammad Moniruzzaman.

"Disco Disco Premer Khelay" - Runa Laila
"Ami Hobo Tar Potro Lekhar" - Sabina Yasmin 
"Basanta Esechhe Pritam Esechhe Bole" - Sabina Yasmin
"Ami Andhar Bhubone Alor Piyashi" - Subir Nandi, Samina Chowdhury, Fahmida Nabi 
"Hridoyer Ochena Duti Nodi" (part 1) - Abida Sultana 
"Hridoyer Ochena Duti Nodi" (part 2) - Abida Sultana

Awards 
Bachsas Awards
Best Actor - Bulbul Ahmed
Best Screenplay - Akhtaruzzaman and Moniruzzaman
Best Director - Akhtaruzzaman and Moniruzzaman
Best Lyrics - Akhtaruzzaman
Best Supporting Actress - Rani Sarkar
Best Music Direction - Sheikh Sadi Khan

References

1983 films
Bengali-language Bangladeshi films
Films scored by Sheikh Sadi Khan
1980s Bengali-language films
Films directed by Akhtaruzzaman